The Elkhorn River Bridge, located on a township road over the Elkhorn River, 3 miles east of Clearwater, Nebraska, was built in 1883 at cost of $2,050.  Also known as Singing Bridge, it is designated NEHBS Number APOO-3. It is a Bowstring through arch truss bridge.  It was built by King Iron Bridge Co.  It was listed on the National Register of Historic Places in 1992.

It has locally become known as the "Singing Bridge" because of sound made when driven over.

Cowboy Trail / 519th Avenue now crosses just to the east of the bridge, which now carries no traffic.

References

External links

Bridges on the National Register of Historic Places in Nebraska
Bridges completed in 1883
Bridges in Antelope County, Nebraska
Tied arch bridges in the United States
National Register of Historic Places in Antelope County, Nebraska